Donja Vrbava is a village in central Serbia. Its inhabitants are known as Vrbavci.

The village had an electrical transformer installed in 2002.

Populated places in Moravica District